Elkins Park station is a SEPTA Regional Rail station located in the Elkins Park neighborhood of Cheltenham Township in Montgomery County, Pennsylvania. The station building is listed on the National Register of Historic Places for its notable architecture. The station is located at the intersection of Park Avenue and Spring Avenue. Elkins Park station is served by the Warminster Line, West Trenton Line, and Lansdale/Doylestown Line.

Station history
The station was constructed in 1898 by Cope & Stewardson, at a cost of $40,000. On May 14, 1899, the station opened to Philadelphia and Reading Railroad train service. Originally, it was known as the Philadelphia and Reading Railroad Elkins Railroad station, but has also been known as Elkins Park station and Ashbourne station. The Queen Anne style architecture of the station resulted in the station being added to the National Register of Historic Places in 1990.

The station has low-level, non-handicapped accessible, railway platforms.  In FY 2013, Elkins Park station had a weekday average of 632 boardings and 599 alightings.

Service
Elkins Park station is located along one of SEPTA's main rail lines. The station is served by most weekday and weekend trains on the Warminster Line, limited weekday trains and all weekend trains on the West Trenton Line, and limited weekday trains and no weekend trains on the Lansdale/Doylestown Line.

Station layout
Elkins Park has two low-level side platforms.

References

External links

SEPTA – Elkins Park Station
Historic and more recent Elkins Park Station images
 Park Avenue entrance from Google Maps Street View

SEPTA Regional Rail stations
Former Reading Company stations
Railway stations on the National Register of Historic Places in Pennsylvania
Railway stations in Montgomery County, Pennsylvania

Queen Anne architecture in Pennsylvania
Railway stations in the United States opened in 1899
Elkins Park, Pennsylvania
1899 establishments in Pennsylvania
Stations on the SEPTA Main Line